Ismail Sheykhmagomedovich Dibirov (born 15 July 2004) is a Russian footballer who plays as a midfielder for FC Khimki.

Club career
Dibirov made his debut for FC Khimki on 22 November 2022 in a Russian Cup game against Pari Nizhny Novgorod.

Career statistics

References

External links
 
 
 

Living people
2004 births
People from Orekhovo-Zuyevo
Sportspeople from Moscow Oblast
Russian footballers
Association football midfielders
Russia youth international footballers
Russian Second League players
FC Khimki players